Ulf Reinhold Dahlén (born January 21, 1967) is a Swedish former professional ice hockey player, and former head coach for HV71 and Frölunda HC in the Swedish Hockey League. His son Jonathan Dahlén was drafted 42nd overall in the 2016 NHL Entry Draft.

Career
Dahlén was drafted seventh overall by the New York Rangers in the 1985 NHL Entry Draft. He played 966 career NHL games, scoring 301 goals, 354 assists and 655 points. During his active playing career, he played for 14 seasons, between 1987–88 and 2002–03, in the NHL for the New York Rangers, Minnesota North Stars, Dallas Stars, San Jose Sharks, Chicago Blackhawks and Washington Capitals. On April 15, 1993, Dahlén scored the final goal in Minnesota North Stars history in a 5-3 loss to the Detroit Red Wings, Russ Courtnall and Dave Gagner assisted on the goal.

After his playing career, he has served as an assistant coach for the Swedish national team and a pro scout for the Dallas Stars; and in June 2006, he was hired as an assistant coach by the Stars. Following the 2007–08 season, Dahlén left Dallas to take the head coaching position for Frölunda HC in Elitserien in Sweden. After three seasons with Frölunda, Dahlén signed as head coach for HV71, where he played for two seasons in the late 1990s.

Accomplishments and awards
Swedish Junior Player of the Year Award (1985)
EJC-A All-Star Team (1985)
Named Best Forward at EJC-A (1985)
WJC-A All-Star Team (1987)
Swedish World All-Star Team (1993)
WC-A All-Star Team (1993)

Career statistics

Regular season and playoffs

International

References

External links
 

1967 births
Living people
Chicago Blackhawks players
Colorado Rangers players
Dallas Stars coaches
Dallas Stars players
Dallas Stars scouts
Ice hockey players at the 1998 Winter Olympics
Ice hockey players at the 2002 Winter Olympics
IF Björklöven players
Minnesota North Stars players
National Hockey League first-round draft picks
New York Rangers draft picks
New York Rangers players
Olympic ice hockey players of Sweden
People from Östersund
San Jose Sharks players
Swedish expatriate ice hockey players in the United States
Swedish ice hockey coaches
Swedish ice hockey left wingers
Washington Capitals players
Sportspeople from Jämtland County